Loth railway station served the hamlet of Lothbeg, in the historical county of Sutherland, Scotland, from 1871 to 1960 on the Duke of Sutherland's Railway.

History 
The station was opened on 19 June 1871 by the Duke of Sutherland's Railway. It had a signal box and a goods yard to the south. The station closed on 13 June 1960.

References 

Disused railway stations in Highland (council area)
Railway stations in Great Britain opened in 1871
Railway stations in Great Britain closed in 1960
1871 establishments in Scotland
1960 disestablishments in Scotland